All India Port and Dock Workers Federation (AIPDWF) , founded in 1949 is the largest trade union representing workers at India's 12 major government-owned ports. It is affiliated with the socialist trade union center Hind Mazdoor Sabha.

The union split in 1989 during a nationwide strike by port workers. The previous agreement between the port unions and the government had expired in January 1988. Frustrated with the lack f progress in negotiations, AIPDWF, as well as unions affiliated with INTUC and AITUC launched a strike in June 1989. After four days, a breakaway faction led by Shanti Patel, called off the strike and gained recognition from the government. AIPDWF ended its strike after another two days.

In recent times, AIPDWF has become a vocal opponent of the Indian government's plan to corporatize the various publicly owned ports, viewing the step as a give-away of public property to private firms.

References

Trade unions in India
Hind Mazdoor Sabha-affiliated unions
Port workers' trade unions
Trade unions established in 1949